A stop sign is a traffic sign designed to notify drivers that they must come to a complete stop and make sure the intersection is safely clear of vehicles and pedestrians before continuing past the sign. In many countries, the sign is a red octagon with the word STOP, in either English or the national language of that particular country, displayed in white or yellow. The Vienna Convention on Road Signs and Signals also allows an alternative version: a red circle with a red inverted triangle with either a white or yellow background, and a black or dark blue STOP. Some countries may also use other types, such as Japan's inverted red triangle stop sign. Particular regulations regarding appearance, installation, and compliance with the signs vary by some jurisdiction.

Design and configuration
The 1968 Vienna Convention on Road Signs and Signals allows for two types of stop sign as well as several acceptable variants. Sign B2a is a red octagon with a white  legend. The European Annex to the convention also allows the background to be "light yellow". Sign B2b is a red circle with a red inverted triangle with either a white or yellow background, and a black or dark blue  legend. The Convention allows for the word "STOP" to be in either English or the national language of the particular country. The finalized version by the United Nations Economic and Social Council's Conference on Road Traffic in 1968 (and in force in 1978) proposed standard stop sign diameters of 600, 900 or 1200 mm (24", 36" or 48").

The United Kingdom and New Zealand stop signs are 750, 900 or 1200 mm (30", 36" or 48"), according to sign location and traffic speeds.

The metric units specified in the US regulatory manuals are rounded approximations of US customary units, not exact conversions. The field, legend, and border are all retroreflective.

Some modern stop signs have flashing LEDs around the perimeter, which has been shown to substantially reduce crashes.

History
 
The first ever stop sign was created by Detroit police sergeant Harold "Harry" Jackson, who was working as a traffic guard at a busy city intersection. One of the cross streets had a particularly low-visibility turn entering the intersection, almost always forcing Sgt. Jackson to slow down and hold back the traffic entering from that street. Looking for ways to make his job easier, he took a rectangular piece of plywood, cut off the corners to give it a distinct shape, wrote "STOP" over the center and placed facing the street. He noticed that his innovation improved the overall traffic flow through the intersection. After he shared his experience with fellow officers at a meeting, the practice started to spread across the city intersections.
Next year, stop signs were adopted across Michigan. As stop signs became more widespread, a rural-dominated committee supported by the American Association of State Highway Officials (AASHO) met in 1922 to standardize them and selected the octagonal shape that has been used in the United States ever since. The unique eight-sided shape of the sign allows drivers facing the back of the sign to identify that oncoming drivers have a stop sign and prevent confusion with other traffic signs. Another consideration of the AASHO was visibility and driver literacy, as summarized in subsequent State Highway Commission reports in the states of the U.S., was that the goal for signs "standardized throughout the Union" was that "The shape of the sign will indicate what it will mean. This has been worked up very carefully by the best qualified men in the country and men who have made a thorough study of this question. It has been found that so many people have trouble in reading the sign that the shape of the sign is very much more important than the reading matter on it."

The octagon was also chosen so that it could be identified easily at night since the original signs were not reflective. The more urban-oriented National Conference on Street and Highway Safety (NCSHS) advocated a smaller red-on-yellow stop sign. These two organizations eventually merged to form the Joint Committee on Uniform Traffic Control Devices, which in 1935 published the first Manual on Uniform Traffic Control Devices for Streets and Highways (MUTCD) detailing the stop sign's specifications.

The MUTCD's stop sign specifications were altered eight times between 1935 and 1971. From 1924 to 1954, stop signs bore a red or black  legend on a yellow field. Yellow was chosen because fade-resistant red materials were not available. Retro-reflective or self-lit signs were permitted in the 1935 MUTCD; retro-reflective ones were first required by the 1948 edition of the MUTCD, which also called for a  height from the road crown to the bottom of the stop sign. The 1954 MUTCD newly specified a white  legend on a red field, and increased the mount height specification to 5 feet in rural areas. Red traffic lights signify stop, so the new specification unified red as a stop signal whether given by a sign or a light.

US mandate, international adoption
The MUTCD stop sign was already widely deployed in the United States when the use of other types of stop signs was eliminated in 1966. In 1968, this sign was adopted by the Vienna Convention on Road Signs and Signals as part of United Nations Economic Commission for Europe's effort to standardize road travel across borders. The Convention specifies that  be written in English or the national language, and also allows a circular sign with red legend. Forty European countries are party to the convention.

Stop signs around the world

The red octagonal field with white English-language  legend is the most common stop sign used around the world, but it is not universal; Japan uses an inverted solid red triangle, for example, and Zimbabwe until 2016 used a disc bearing a black cross. Moreover, there are many variants of the red-and-white octagonal sign. Although all English-speaking and many other countries use the word  on stop signs, some jurisdictions use an equivalent word in their primary language instead, or in addition. Also, several languages  borrowed the English word "stop" a long time ago, such as French, and therefore do not consider it to be a foreign word any more.
The use of native languages is common on U.S. native reservations, especially those promoting language revitalization efforts, for example, and Israel uses no word, but rather a pictogram of a hand in a palm-forward "stop" gesture.

Asia
Countries in Asia generally use a native word, often in a non-Latin script.

Europe
Countries in Europe generally have stop signs with the text , regardless of local language. There were some objections to this when introduced around the 1970s, but now this is accepted. Turkey (and the unrecognized Turkish Republic of Northern Cyprus) is a notable exception to this, instead using the Turkish word for stop: "dur".

Latin America
In Spanish and Portuguese-speaking Caribbean and South American countries (Argentina, Bolivia, Brazil, Chile, Colombia, Cuba, Dominican Republic, Ecuador, Paraguay, Peru, Puerto Rico, Uruguay, and Venezuela), signs bear the legend  ("stop" in Portuguese and Spanish). Mexico and Central American countries bear the legend  ("halt") instead.

Canada

Both stop and arrêt are considered valid French words, with France actually using the word "STOP" on its stop signs, and the Office québécois de la langue française (OQLF) notes that the use of "stop" on stop signs is attested in French since 1927. At the time of the debates surrounding the adoption of the Charter of the French Language ("Bill 101") in 1977, the usage of "stop" was considered to be English and therefore controversial; some signs were occasionally vandalized with red spray paint to turn the word  into "101". However, it was later officially determined by the OQLF that "stop" is a valid French word in this context, and the older dual  /  usage is therefore considered redundant and therefore deprecated (à éviter). Newly installed signs thus use only one word, more commonly only  in Québec, while  is seen in predominantly English-speaking areas. On First Nations or Inuit territories, stop signs sometimes use the local aboriginal language in addition or instead of English, French, or both, such as Inuktitut . All other English-speaking areas of Canada use .

Other countries
Arabic-speaking countries use   (except for Lebanon, which only uses  since 2018).
India, Australia, New Zealand, United Kingdom, Indonesia, The Philippines, Pakistan, The European Economic Area, Fiji, Singapore, and the United States use the standard version of the sign.
Brazil and Spanish-speaking Caribbean and South American nations use 
Canada uses both the standard version of the sign and multilingual stop signs.
Cambodia uses  .
China and Taiwan use  , except that Mainland China's sign has a bolder word.
Cuba uses a version of the B2b stop sign that says 
Ethiopia uses a version of the sign that says   and 
Hong Kong SAR uses a version of the sign that says  , and 
Iran and Afghanistan use  
Israel and Palestine uses a version of the stop sign with a raised hand.
Japan uses a triangular sign that says   and 
Laos uses  
Malaysia and Brunei use 
Mexico and other Central American nations use 
Mongolia uses  
Myanmar uses  
Nigeria uses a variant of the B1a stop sign with a yellow typeface.
North Korea uses  
Portuguese-speaking countries with the exception of Brazil use the standard version of the sign
South Africa, like most nations, uses the B2a stop sign.
South Korea uses   and  
Spain uses 
Thailand uses  
Tonga uses a version of the B2b stop sign with the text overlapping the triangle inside the circle.  
Turkey uses 
United Arab Emirates, Oman, Qatar, Kuwait, Bahrain and Saudi Arabia use a multilingual stop sign that says both   and  except Tunisia and Algeria, which use a different version of the sign.
Vanuatu uses a circular red stop sign.
Vietnam uses a version of the stop sign with smaller text: .

Historical gallery
The following are some older stop sign designs, used before the Vienna Road Traffic Convention standardized the design:

Application

The use of stop signs varies from country. North America and South Africa use all-way stops in some intersections unlike in some countries where they are legally prohibited. In a majority of Central Asian countries, as well as Cuba in North America, junctions without traffic lights or roundabouts are controlled by stop signs on minor roads and by white, yellow and black priority diamond signs on the major road. In Europe and Australia, stop signs are restricted to places where coming to a dead stop is deemed necessary because of severely limited sight lines. At the vast majority of minor intersections in these countries give way signs or equivalent road markings are used, or the intersections are no-priority; roundabouts also work on the give way (rather than stop) principle.

North America
Stop signs are often used in North America to control conflicting traffic movements at intersections that are deemed not busy enough to justify the installation of a traffic signal or roundabout. In the United States, the stop sign is not intended as a traffic calming device, but is meant to be installed mainly for safety or to assign right-of-way. Stop signs may be erected on all intersecting roads, resulting in an all-way stop. Some research has concluded that stop signs do not offer measurable safety benefits over the Yield approach. Other research has concluded that multiway stop signs do not effectively control traffic speeds, and can give rise to negative effects including increased traffic noise and pollution from braking and accelerating vehicles, enforcement problems, and reduced sign compliance.

On school buses

A stop sign on a pivoting arm is required equipment on North American school buses. The sign normally stows flat on the left side of the bus, and is deployed by the driver when opening the door for picking up or dropping off passengers. Some buses have two such stop arms, one near the front facing forwards, and one near the rear facing backwards. The stop sign is retroreflective and equipped either with red blinking lights above and below the  legend or with a legend that is illuminated by LEDs. Unlike a normal stop sign, this sign indicates a two-way absolute stop, requiring other vehicles travelling in both directions to remain stopped until the sign is retracted.

Europe
In Europe, stop signs are generally placed at sites where visibility is severely restricted, or where a high crash rate has been noted. In some European countries, stop signs are placed at level crossings to mark the stop line. For most situations, Europe uses the give way sign instead. All-way stops, which are common in North America, are exceedingly rare in Europe. Comparatively, roundabouts and priority to the right intersections are more common.

United Kingdom
In the United Kingdom, stop signs may only be placed at junctions with tramways or sites with severely restricted visibility. Until 2016, each stop sign had to be individually approved by the Secretary of State for Transport. This requirement was removed by the 2016 amendments to the Traffic Signs Regulations and General Directions; the responsibility for approving stop signs now lies with local authorities.

Section 79 of the Highways Act 1980 enables the government to improve visibility at junctions, as by removing or shortening walls or hedges. The Department for Transport considers improving visibility to be preferable to installing a stop sign. The former UK practice of using "Halt" or "Slow" at Major Road Ahead signs was discontinued in 1965 at the recommendation of the Worboys Committee. Instead of replacing all the old  signs with the new Vienna Convention  sign, the  sign became the standard one at UK priority junctions.

Compliance requirements
Laws and regulations regarding how drivers must comply with a stop sign vary by jurisdiction. In the United States and Canada, these rules are set and enforced at the state or provincial level. At a junction where two or more traffic directions are controlled by stop signs, US and Canada practice generally has the driver who arrives and stops first continue first. If two or three drivers in different directions stop simultaneously at a junction controlled by stop signs, generally the drivers on the left must yield the right-of-way to the driver on the far right.

In all countries, the driver must come to a complete stop before passing a stop sign, even if no other vehicle or pedestrian is visible. If a stop line is marked on the pavement, drivers must stop before crossing the line. Slowing but not completely stopping is called a "rolling stop", sometimes nicknamed after a city or region where it is considered endemic (e.g., "Rhode Island roll" or "California stop") – slowing down significantly but not stopping completely at the sign. This partial stop is not acceptable to most law enforcement officials, and can result in a traffic citation. However, enforcement of this rule varies widely among countries. The automobile manufacturer Tesla removed a "rolling stop" feature from its self-driving software after the National Highway Traffic Safety Administration complained the practice is unsafe and illegal everywhere in the United States.

In some countries such as Czechia and Russia, stopping is required only at a place where a driver has a sufficient view into the intersection, not at the border of the intersection (where a "STOP" line is not present). Therefore, if multiple drivers come from the same direction and all of them stop at appropriate place, they can continue without stopping again.

Bicyclists
In some jurisdictions, such as the U.S. state of Idaho, the traffic code allows for bicyclists approaching a stop sign to slow down and yield to conflicting traffic, then proceed without stopping unless safety requires a full stop. The Idaho law has been in effect since 1982 and has not been shown to be detrimental to safety. Since 2017, more states have implemented changes to the law similar to Idaho's: Delaware (2017), Oregon (2020), Washington (2020), Utah (2021) and North Dakota (2021). Cyclist advocacy groups have sought similar laws for other jurisdictions in the United States.

Disadvantages
Stop sign placement can pose difficulties and hazards in applications where cross traffic is not controlled by a sign or light. Relatively long distance between the stop sign and the crossroad facilitates accurate perception of the speed of approaching cross traffic, but lengthens the time and distance required to enter and clear the junction. Relatively short distance between the stop sign and the crossroad shortens the time required for safe passage through the intersection, but degrades the ability of the stopped driver to accurately perceive the speed of approaching cross traffic. Specifically, drivers approaching an intersection from beyond the subtended angular velocity detection threshold (SAVT) limit may be perceived by a stopped driver as standing still rather than approaching, which means the stopped driver may not make an accurate decision as to whether it is safe to proceed past the stop sign. Whether the distance between the stop sign and the crossroad is officially short or is shortened by drivers creeping past the stop line, they can lose the visual acuity of lateral motion, leaving them to rely on the SAVT. This can make it difficult to accurately estimate the movement of approaching cross traffic. According to recent game-theoretical analysis, at intersections where all directions face stop signs, drivers have strong incentives to run the stop sign; A better solution is to randomly remove one stop sign from all directions, which could lead to significant efficiency gains while ensure safe traffic.

See also

 All-way stop
 Assured Clear Distance Ahead
 Road traffic safety
 Roundabout
 Rules of the road
 Stopping sight distance
 Traffic psychology
 Yield sign

References

External links

 History of Stop Signs
 Stop Sign Photo Gallery
 A Collection of Stop and Yield Signs
 Stop Sign Template

Traffic signs
American inventions
1915 introductions
Red symbols